Bodil Birgitte Udsen (12 January 1925 – 26 February 2008) was a Danish actress.

She was a student at the Rysensteen Gymnasium in Copenhagen in 1944 and entered film in 1955. She also worked extensively in Danish theatre and appeared in the Danish TV series Huset på Christianshavn as Emma from 1970 to 1977.

Selected filmography 

 Blændværk (1955) – Dame fra børneværnet
  (1957) – Grete
 Styrmand Karlsen (1958) – Olga
  (1960) – Gerda Høg Hansen
 Poeten og Lillemor og Lotte (1960) – The midwife
  (1960) – Fru Bertelsen
 Sommerlandet (1961) – Speaker (voice)
 Poeten og Lillemor i forårshumør (1961) – Jordmoderen
 Støv på hjernen (1961) – Rigmor Hansen
  (1961) – 'Fruggi' Berthelsen
  (1961) – Økonoma frk. Svendsen
 Det støver stadig (1962) – Fru Rigmor Hansen
 Der brænder en ild (1962) – Marie
 Vi har det jo dejligt (1963) – Opfinderens kone
 Frøken April (1963) – Fru Rasmussen
 Støv for alle pengene (1963) – Fru Rigmor
 Selvmordsskolen (1964) – Sundhedsplejerske
 Don Olsen kommer til byen (1964) – Enken
  (1965) – Lillemus (Fru Mortensen)
  (1966) – Fru. Munke
 Onkel Joakims hemmelighed (1967) – Mona Lisa (uncredited)
  (1967) – Tante Karla
  (1968) – Tante Kamma
 Sjov i gaden (1969) – Hans sure kone
  (1969) – Emili Jonsen
 Huset på Christianshavn (1970–1977)
 Ballade på Christianshavn (1971) – Emma
  (1971) – Gigoloens pige
 Lenin, din gavtyv (1972) – En tysk socialdemokrat
  (1972, TV Mini-Series) – Stine
  (1972) – Johnnys mor
  (1972) – Cathrine
 Aladdin eller den forunderlige lampe (1975–1976, TV Mini-Series) – Morgiane
  (1976) – Kirstens mor
 Slægten (1978)
 Matador (1978–1981)
 Historien om en moder (1979)
  (1984)
 Samson og Sally (1984)
 Peter von Scholten (1987)
  (1988)
  (1992)
 Family Matters (1993)
  (1995)
  (1996–1997)
 Barbara (1997)
  (2001)
 Monas Verden (2001)
  (2001)
 Jeg er Dina (2002)
  (2003)
 Den du frygter (2008)

References

External links 
 Danish film database
 
 Danish article

1925 births
2008 deaths
Actresses from Copenhagen
Danish film actresses
Danish stage actresses
Danish television actresses
Best Actress Robert Award winners